Methylenolactocin is a chemical compound that has been isolated from Penicillium.  It has weak activity in an animal model of Ehrlich carcinoma.

Notes

Lactones
Carboxylic acids
Vinylidene compounds